Helen Connolly (born December 1972)  is a British businesswoman. She is the Chief Commercial Officer of New Look and was previously the chief executive officer of Bonmarché.

Early life
She attended Manchester Metropolitan University, where she studied Clothing.

Career

Dorothy Perkins
She worked for Dorothy Perkins as head of Buying from 2006 to 2008.

Asda
She worked for Asda from 2003 to 2006, and from 2008 to 2016.

Bonmarché
In August 2016 she became the chief executive of Bonmarché. The former chief executive became chief executive of Karen Millen. In December 2019, Connolly stepped down from her position.

New Look
In January 2020 she became the Chief Commercial Officer for New Look, replacing Roger Wightman, who had worked for New Look for 30 Years.

References

External links
 Bonmarché

Alumni of Manchester Metropolitan University
British retail chief executives
British women chief executives
1972 births
Living people